Rocester railway station was a railway station built by the North Staffordshire Railway (NSR) located at Rocester in Staffordshire.

History

Three years later the station became a junction station when the NSR built a branch to  via . This was met in 1899 by the Ashbourne Line from  built by the LNWR.

The aim of the LNWR was to run expresses from Buxton to London, as well as gaining access to Derby and the East Midlands. In fact the expresses never materialised, being no more than through coaches attached to other trains at Uttoxeter. Even in LMS days when the trains ran through from Buxton to Rocester, they were timetabled as different services which included a "through coach."

Passenger services to Ashbourne finished in 1954 and freight ended in 1964. The station closed when the Churnet Valley Line closed in 1965.

Route

References

Disused railway stations in Staffordshire
Borough of East Staffordshire
Railway stations in Great Britain opened in 1849
Railway stations in Great Britain closed in 1965
Former North Staffordshire Railway stations
Beeching closures in England
1849 establishments in England
1965 disestablishments in England